Walnut Lake may refer to:

Lakes
 Walnut Lake in Desha County, Arkansas
 Walnut Lake in Lee County, Arkansas
 Walnut Lake (West Bloomfield Township, Michigan)
 Walnut Lake, in Faribault County, Minnesota

Other
 Walnut Lake Road, part of Metropolitan Parkway, in Metro Detroit, Michigan
 Walnut Lake Township, Faribault County, Minnesota